The Grand synagogue of Aden ( Al-Milama’l-kabira), also known as Shield of Avraham Synagogue or "Magen Avraham", was built in 1858. The synagogue was founded in 1860 by Menahem Messa. It was large enough to house over 2,000 worshipers. The pulpit was made of marble – pure, white and polished, with 7 marble steps leading up to it. The floor was made of marble sections, patterned black and white as on a chess board. The ark was built into the wall pile or stack, and covered by six curtains woven with silk and interwoven with gleaming sapphires, above them the crowns of the torah. The torah scrolls were adorned with crowns and pomegranates, some of them gold, and some of them pure refined silver.

The two tablets of the 10 commandments on both sides of the doors were made of polished silver. The huge ceiling was supported by eight wooden columns, four on each side. Each column had a radius of 80 inches and were 40 feet high. The ceiling and the numerous windows are replete with stained glass in blazing colour and dozens of lanterns.
Along the Eastern wall was a women’s section with 200 places. The entrance to the synagogue was through a huge courtyard which also served as a place of worship on Sabbath and the high holy days. A mikvah was also built on the southern side of the synagogue.

See also
 History of the Jews in Aden
 Jews of Hadramaut
 Habbani Jews
 History of the Jews in the Arabian Peninsula
 Jewish exodus from Arab lands
 Yemenite Jews

References

Professor Reuben Ahroni
https://www.youtube.com/watch?v=zndbhdnwQFg
https://www.cs.cmu.edu/~kraut/Family_Photos/pages/Aden/Aden.shtml
"West of Aden", Yacov Tobi

Jews and Judaism in Yemen
Jewish Yemeni history
History of the Jews in the Middle East
Destroyed synagogues
Orthodox synagogues
Synagogues completed in 1858
Synagogues in Yemen
Buildings and structures in Aden
Orthodox Judaism in the Arab world
Orthodox Judaism in the Middle East